Advances in Optics and Photonics is a monthly peer-reviewed scientific journal published by The Optical Society. It covers review articles and multimedia tutorials on significant advances in optics and photonics. Its editor-in-chief is Guifang Li (University of Central Florida). 

According to the Journal Citation Reports, the journal has a 2021 impact factor of 24.750.

References

External links

Optics journals
English-language journals
Monthly journals
Publications established in 2009
Optica (society) academic journals